Hartland, elevation 922 feet (281 meters), is an unincorporated community and census-designated place in McHenry County, Illinois, United States. It was named a CDP before the 2020 census, at which time it had a population of 157.

Geography
The historical center of the community is found on Nelson Road (County Highway A-28), immediately east of the Union Pacific Railroad, which traverses the area on a northwest–southeast angle. The junction of Hartland Road (County Highway T-68) is found a short distance west of this grade crossing. In terms of geographic coordinates, the community is located at  (42.3636315, -88.5073165) In terms of the Public Land Survey System, Hartland is located near the midpoint of the dividing line between Sections 22 and 23, Township 45 North, Range 6 East of the Third Principal Meridian. The heart of the old community is on the Section 23 side of the line. Hartland is served by the Woodstock, Illinois 60098 post office.

Demographics

2020 census

Points of interest
In addition to the rustic buildings of the old town, Hartland is home to the Hartland Township facility, 15813 Nelson Road; the McHenry County Division of Transportation office, 16111 Nelson Road; and the Valley Hi, County Nursing Home, 2406 Hartland Road.

See also
 Hartland Township

Notes and references 

Census-designated places in Illinois
Census-designated places in McHenry County, Illinois
Chicago metropolitan area